In mathematics, especially in the study of dynamical systems and differential equations, the stable manifold theorem is an important result about the structure of the set of orbits approaching a given hyperbolic fixed point. It roughly states that the existence of a local diffeomorphism near a fixed point implies the existence of a local stable center manifold containing that fixed point. This manifold has dimension equal to the number of eigenvalues of the Jacobian matrix of the fixed point that are less than 1.

Stable manifold theorem 
Let 

The theorem states that

See also 
 Center manifold theorem
 Lyapunov exponent

Notes

References

External links 

Dynamical systems
Theorems in dynamical systems